Gregory Colgan (born 5 November 1953) is an Australian cricketer. He played one first-class match for Western Australia in 1977/78.

References

External links
 

1953 births
Living people
Australian cricketers
Western Australia cricketers
Cricketers from Perth, Western Australia